WRIC could refer to two broadcast stations in  United States:

WRIC-TV, a television station licensed to Petersburg, Virginia
WRIC-FM, a radio station licensed to Richlands, Virginia